Cuddyback Lake is a lake in north-central Garfield County, Utah, United States.

Description

Cuddyback Lake bears the surname of an area rancher.

See also

 List of lakes in Utah

References

Lakes of Utah
Lakes of Garfield County, Utah